Monte Zucker M.Photog.Cr., Hon.M.Photog., API, F-ASP (born on September 1, 1929, died March 15, 2007) was an American photographer. He specialized in wedding photography, entering it as a profession in 1947. In the 1970s he operated a studio in Silver Spring, Maryland. Later he lived in Florida.

He was Brides Magazine's Wedding Photographer of the Year for 1990 and United Nations Photographer of the Year for 2002, and one of Canon's "Explorers of Light". Additionally, he was a prolific author and teacher, with monthly columns in magazines such as Shutterbug. Several manufacturers made equipment bearing his name, most notably Westcott's "Monte Reflector" and ALM's "Monte Zucker Pneumatic Posing Stool".

Unlike many photographers of his generation, he readily embraced new technology, particularly digital photography and Adobe Photoshop, featuring digital techniques in his columns right up until the end of his life, and relating them to earlier methods. He did a series of traveling workshops taught by himself and Eddie Tapp, who covered Photoshop techniques.

Quotations
He noted in one column that one of his maxims was "See the finished picture before you even snap the shutter!", repeated at each of three training seminars attended by, amongst others, British photographer Barney Douglas, in the United Kingdom in the late 1980s, but at the same time he stated of a digitally retouched image, "Did I have this in mind when I first created the image? Yes and no. I wanted to create something artistic, something special. Did I know how I was going to do it? Not really."

"If you like the way it looks, go with it! I liked it and I did it! Of course, it takes a lot of experience to develop good taste. When one is just starting out it's easy to like something without knowing if it's really good or not. That works some of the time, but an educated opinion usually works better."

Early career

Monte Zucker started doing photography in high school in Washington, D.C., shooting for friends who remained loyal clients over the years as they became successful and affluent professionals and businessmen. By the early 1970s he had specialized in wedding photography, working almost exclusively for the most affluent members of the Jewish community in the Washington, D.C. area, primarily shooting weddings and bar mitzvahs.

Innovator

In the 1960s most formal portraits were taken with large cumbersome pack and head flash units, with wedding reception "candid" photos taken with a single flash on camera and dimensionally flat lighting.

What set Monte's work apart from his peers was the innovative use of daylight from a north-facing window and a reflector for his formal posed portraits using backgrounds he had hand-painted on  linen roll-up window shades to mimic the look of Old Master painters. He cleverly marketed this style as an "Old Master Style" which appealed to his niche market.

By the late 1960s color had started replacing black and white for shooting weddings, and electronic flash guns replaced flash bulbs. A technical shortcoming of color was a much shorter range on the prints which could not reproduce the full range of detail in a photograph containing a bride in white dress standing with the groom in a black suit when a single flash on camera was used. Familiar with conventional studio lighting, thanks in part to training with New Jersey photographer Joe Zeltsman, Monte understood that the solution to the shorter range film was to control the range of the scene with two lights; one off camera for modeling (key light), over a foundation of even centered light (fill) to control the tone of the shadows. With the invention of the photo-cell trigger which allowed wireless firing of the off-camera "key" flash, Monte utilized the technology to create studio-like lighting "on the fly" at wedding receptions using two identical direct flash units, one mounted over the camera as fill to control the shadow tone and a second optically triggered key light for 3D modeling which he mounted on a rolling converted medical IV stand, a clever solution to the logistics of working with the off-camera light.

The difference in the realism of the photos both in tonal range and 3D modeling that dual-flash candid shooting provided revolutionized wedding photography and created a new career for Monte teaching others how to duplicate his style.

His style was characterized by precise control of lighting pattern and facial angles in every "candid" reception shot. Technically it gave them a three-dimensional quality and full rich tonal range that the work of his contemporaries lacked, but more importantly his photographs always flattered the subjects, even in something as mundane as a group shot of guests.

Monte also was innovative in his approach to covering a wedding. Rather than trying to photograph the live action of the ceremony under unflattering available light he would instead, by prior arrangement, recreate all the traditional parts of the ceremony afterwards using carefully controlled dual-flash lighting and poses while the guests were en route to the reception. When combined with the other window and dual flash photos in the leather-bound album, the finished product had the polished look of a Hollywood movie.

Logistically the decision to use window lighting and portable flash was also innovative and brilliant. By using window light he was able to set up and shoot anywhere during the day with a minimum of equipment. Not needing a "brick and mortar" studio allowed him to work for many years out of his Silver Spring home with just a reception area and room for meeting clients which lowered his overhead.

Monte later opened studios in a high-end department store, shopping mall and other locations and switched to using studio flash rather than window light. He continued to innovate, setting up his studio with identical "key" and "hair" lights on both sides of the room allowing a subject to be faced right or left, depending on their most flattering side, without the need to move the lighting gear—another example of his "keep it simple" approach to the technical part of the craft. It also likely convinced other photographers to equip their studios similarly, which no doubt pleased his studio lighting equipment sponsor.

Intuitive marketing genius

Monte was highly regarded by others in wedding-related businesses due to his practice of routinely photographing flower arrangements, the wedding cake, food buffets, and the band in action at weddings and sending the vendors free prints to show off their work. He took the extra step of identically matting and framing the prints to make it easy for the vendors to hang them up. It was an example of Monte's intuitive marketing acumen because very top-end wedding business in the Washington area had a "Monte Wall" with his name gold foil stamped in the corner of every photo, which generated enthusiastic referrals.

Second career as a teacher

In the 1960s most wedding photographers were members of the Professional Photographers of America (PPofA), which regularly held print competitions at meetings and conventions. Monte, with his innovative combination of window lighting and dual flash, started winning competitions at the state and national levels in the "Candid" category of the competitions, which gave him recognition beyond his small niche market. Awards in competition led to offers to teach at PPofA events and training seminars, and to writing a column on wedding photography he called "Candid Comments" in the PPofA magazine. He also attracted the support of sponsors such as Rolleiflex (whose cameras he used at the time) and Meisel Photo Labs (which he used for his own work).

Monte's teaching style was based on the idea of keeping the technical side of wedding photography simple to the point of being instinctive and effortless, allowing the photographer to focus 100% of their attention on interaction with the clients and putting them at ease.

For example, to get perfect full-range lighting ratios in candid reception shots he used identical flash units controlling the ratio and keeping it consist by controlling distance. With that simple-to-grasp technique it was possible to capture every shot at a wedding reception with stunning 3D and perfectly controlled ratios and exposure as instinctively as focusing the camera.

Devising similar easy to learn "1-2-3" techniques for posing people and finding the most flattering facial angles allowed Mr. Zucker to effectively teach complex topics like lighting and posing at large venues like a PPofA National convention to an audience of hundreds in a way they could later go home and duplicate successfully. That made him very popular as a speaker and instructor but also opened him up to criticism by some as having a rigid, non-creative, rule-based "paint by numbers" or "cookie-cutter" approach. But in the context of wedding photography where the goal is to flatter the couple and guest, and there is often one chance to capture action, that was a formula for predictable flattering results and a satisfied client.

Later years
An irony of becoming recognized and very successful for having a distinctive style in a niche market like weddings is that clients, both photographic and students, wanted his trademark style, making it difficult to stray too far from it.

Monte's decision to retire from the wedding business and relocate to Florida in the 1990s was liberating for him creatively because it freed him from the constraint of his classic wedding style and coincided with the innovations of digital photography and the Internet. He embraced both with the same enthusiasm and lack of creative restraints he had as a teenager discovering photography for the first time, and shared his experiences with others via Zuga.net, a website collaboration with a former full-time assistant Gary Bernstein who had struck out on his own in 1972 and become a recognized fashion and celebrity photographer and author.

His "retirement" was short-lived, and up to the time of his death he remained a popular speaker and teacher, sharing his enthusiasm for the new digital capture and editing medium without the creative restraint of the conventional style of portraiture and wedding coverage which had made him a renowned photographer who was universally recognized by just his first name.

Personal life
Unusually for a photography magazine columnist, Zucker mentioned aspects of his personal life in his columns, including his diagnosis of terminal cancer. Shortly after the diagnosis, he arranged a four-generation photo session that included himself, his children, grandchildren, and a great-grandchild, and photos from that session appeared in his Shutterbug column.

His marriage to Sondra Wool Zucker ended in divorce. Zucker always recognized his Homosexuality after his divorce. Survivors include two daughters, Tammi Zucker Thurm of Greensboro, N.C., and Sherri Heller of Sacramento, CA; two grandchildren; and two great-grandchildren. His brother Seymour (Sy) Zucker passed away in January 2021.

At the age of 77 Zucker died from pancreatic cancer at his home in Fort Lauderdale, Florida.

Notes

External links
Official site
Rangefinder article on Zucker
Rangefinder article stating Senator Kennedy honors Zucker
Shutterbug: In Memoriam
Washington Post obituary

References
 Shutterbug, December 2003, p. 12.
 Shutterbug, November 2005, p. 18.
 Shutterbug, December 2005, p. 18.

2007 deaths
20th-century American photographers
Wedding photographers
1929 births